In the United Kingdom, various titles are used for the head of government of each of the countries of the United Kingdom, Crown Dependencies, and Overseas Territories. Following elections to the assembly or parliament, the party (or coalition) with a majority of seats is invited to form a government. The monarch (in the United Kingdom) or governorlieutenant governor (in the Overseas Territories and Crown Dependencies) appoints the head of government, whose council of ministers are collectively responsible to the assembly.

The head of the British government is referred to as the prime minister, the leader of one of the constituent countries is referred to as a first minister, and the terms chief minister and premier are used in the Overseas Territories. In the Crown Dependencies, the term chief minister is used in all apart from Guernsey, where the leader is referred to as the president of the Policy and Resources Committee.

Government of the United Kingdom

Devolved governments

Crown Dependencies

Overseas Territories

Timeline

See also

 List of rulers of the United Kingdom and predecessor states
 List of current viceregal representatives of the Crown

Notes

References 

United Kingdom
Chief ministers